Huang Yang (born 30 October 1983) is a Chinese-born Hong Kongese professional footballer who currently plays as a defensive midfielder for Hong Kong Premier League club Kitchee and captains the Hong Kong national team. He was the Hong Kong Footballer of the Year in 2013.

Early career
Huang played for Shanghai Shenhua's youth academy when he was 15. He was a member of the team that trained in Brazil with São Paulo FC and Portuguesa. He played for China as captain at the 2005 Summer Universiade. and was loaned by Shenhua to Shanghai Qunying.

University
Huang attended Donghua University and played football at the same time. When he graduated he gave up professional football to start work. A year later, Donghua's football team re-called him as an alumnus when Hong Kong Polytechnic University (HKPU) arrived in Shanghai for a friendly. At the time, the HKPU wanted to recruit Chinese students with football talent and Huang thus joined to study at HKPU. In the three years since he joined, Hong Kong Polytechnic University won the University Sports Federation of Hong Kong's football competition twice, including in 2011 when Huang was captain and scored the winning penalty. After that, Huang completed his second degree and decided to join Kitchee to complete his unfinished dream.

Club career

Kitchee
He finished his studies in summer 2011 and Kitchee recruited him for the 2011–12 Hong Kong First Division League season. As he has already spent 3 years in Hong Kong as a student, he could be registered as a local player. The first game he played for Kitchee was against Chelsea FC in the 2011 Barclays Asia Trophy. He was the player who managed Kitchee's only shot at the Chelsea goal. He then played in the third place play-off against Blackburn Rovers. He received good reviews from the fans despite the 0–3 loss. On 18 September 2011, he scored his first goal in Hong Kong in his club's 4–2 win over Tai Po.

On 4 January 2020, Huang made his 250th appearance for the club in the Sapling Cup match against Rangers.

International career
On 2 February 2012, Huang was called up to the Hong Kong national football team by Ernie Merrick for the friendly against Chinese Taipei. On 29 February 2012, he made his debut for Hong Kong against Chinese Taipei.

On 11 October 2016, Huang scored his first international goal for Hong Kong in the friendly against Singapore.

Starting from the 2019 EAFF E-1 Football Championship Round 2 in November 2018, Huang has become the captain of Hong Kong.

Career statistics

Club

Notes

International

Honours

Club
Kitchee
Hong Kong Premier League: 2014–15, 2016–17, 2017–18,  2019–20
Hong Kong First Division: 2011–12, 2013–14
Hong Kong Senior Shield: 2016–17, 2018–19
Hong Kong FA Cup: 2011–12, 2012–13, 2014–15, 2016–17, 2017–18, 2018–19
Hong Kong Sapling Cup: 2017–18, 2019–20
Hong Kong League Cup: 2011–12, 2014–15, 2015–16
Hong Kong Community Cup: 2016–17, 2017–18
Hong Kong AFC Play-Off: 2015–16

Individual
Hong Kong Footballer of the Year: 2013

References

External links

1983 births
Living people
Hong Kong footballers
Hong Kong international footballers
Association football midfielders
Hong Kong First Division League players
Hong Kong Premier League players
Kitchee SC players
Donghua University alumni